Lawrence Whitfield Major  was a senior naval officer in the Bahamas. Whitfield joined the Bahamas' police force in 1950.  In 1971, when the Police force created a Police Marine Division, Major was put in charge.  During his career Major held other senior positions within Bahamas Ministry of Security.  When Major retired from the Police he was an assistant commissioner.  He was then appointed Warden of the Bahamas main prison.

Early life and family 
Major was born on 19 March 1933 to Lloyd Major and Lilly Major in Moss Town, Exuma, Bahamas.

Legacy 

In 1979 Major was made a Member of the Order of the British Empire. In 2016 the Royal Bahamas Defence Force, the agency that evolved from the Police Marine Division that Major commanded, commissioned the HMBS Lawrence Major.

References 

Bahamian police officers
Members of the Order of the British Empire
Recipients of the Colonial Police Medal
Commonwealth recipients of the Queen's Police Medal
1933 births
2008 deaths